The 2000–01 Slovenian Football Cup was the tenth season of the Slovenian Football Cup, Slovenia's football knockout competition.

Qualified clubs

1999–2000 Slovenian PrvaLiga members
Beltinci
Celje
Domžale
Dravograd
Gorica
Korotan Prevalje
Maribor
Mura
Olimpija
Pohorje
Primorje
Rudar Velenje

Qualified through MNZ Regional Cups
MNZ Ljubljana: Elan, Bela Krajina, Livar
MNZ Maribor: Železničar Maribor, Pobrežje, Paloma
MNZ Celje: Šentjur, Vransko
MNZ Koper: Korte, Jadran
MNZ Nova Gorica: Renče, Tolmin
MNZ Murska Sobota: Bakovci, Kema Puconci
MNZ Lendava: Nafta Lendava, Odranci
MNZG-Kranj: Triglav Kranj, Bled
MNZ Ptuj: Boč, Aluminij

First round

|}

Round of 16

|}

Quarter-finals

|}

Semi-finals

|}

Final

First leg

Second leg

References

Slovenian Football Cup seasons
Cup
Slovenian Cup